Christiani & Nielsen (Thai) Public Company Limited is a construction contractor with major operations in Thailand and Southeast Asia.  Originally a Danish company, it is today a listed company majority owned by the GP Group.

The company provides a comprehensive range of construction services, including the design and construction of a variety of buildings and civil engineering works, steel structures with a full range of electrical and mechanical engineering services.

Early years
Christiani & Nielsen was established by Rudolf Christiani, a Danish civil engineer, and Aage Nielsen, a captain in the Royal Danish Navy, in Copenhagen in 1904 to build bridges, marine works, and other reinforced concrete structures.  It soon established a branch in Hamburg, and after World War I, extended its operations to the United Kingdom, South America, Australia, and South Africa with Roberts Construction. (now known as Concor).

Management Executives
Mr. Khushroo Wadia is the Managing Director of the Company since late 2013.

The other Key Executives of the Company are as under:
1.  Mr. Khushroo Wadia - Managing Director
2.  Mr. Surasak Osathanugraha - Assistant to Managing Director (Finance & Accounts)
3.  Mr. Vites Ratanakorn - Operation Director
4.  Mr. Pichet Nimpanich - Business Development Director
5.  Mr. Manu Benjamanee - Director – General Building Business Unit
6.  Mr. Watchara Promkhunthong - Director – Petrochemical and Special Industry Business Unit
7.  Mr. Pongsak Dittapongpakdee - Director – Government Works Business Unit 
8.  Mr. Pongsak Sutthapreeda - Director – General Constriction and MEP Business Unit

Thailand operations
Christiani & Nielsen (Siam) Ltd. was established on 28 February 1930. Over the years, the company executed a large number of projects, including
 Democracy Monument
 Bangkok Port
 The Krungthep, Krungthon, and Nonathburi bridges spanning Bangkok's Chao Phraya River
 Rajadamnern Boxing Stadium
 The Sukhothai Hotel in Bangkok
 The 13th Asian Games Sports Stadium
 All Seasons Place office complex
 SCG 100 Years New Office building, certified as LEED Platinum Class 
 Prince Mahidol Hall 
 Khon Kaen & Krabi Airport Extension
 PTTLNG TANK
 Highway 3191 Map Ta Phut
 Michelin warehouse

The Thai company was the first construction company to be listed on the Stock Exchange of Thailand in 1991. In December 1992 it completed a reverse takeover of its publicly listed Danish parent company, the first such transaction in Thai business history.

It later expanded into Malaysia and Vietnam, along with investment in engineering and property related businesses. As a result of the Asian financial crisis in 1997, the company needed to undertake extensive restructuring by disposing of foreign subsidiaries and other investments, and thereafter decided to focus on its core construction business in Thailand.

The past few years have seen radical changes in the shareholding structure of the company.  To comply with new regulations of the Bank of Thailand, in 2008, long standing major shareholder Siam Commercial Bank PCL sold its stake to the Crown Property Bureau, its largest shareholder, giving the CPB a majority share in the company. Thereafter, in 2011, the Crown Property Bureau sold all its shares in the company to the GP Group which thereby became the new major shareholder of the Company.

New facilities
New facilities including new offices, a plant and steel fabrication yard, and a training center for staff and workers. For the new offices, the company purchased land in Bang Na District and built a seven-storey building which can accommodate up to 750 staff. In 2013, the old plant and steel fabrication yard moved to newly purchased premises in Si Racha District. The equipment yard houses some 10,000 items of construction machinery, tools, scaffolding and form work. The steel fabrication yard has a production capacity of over 10,000 tonnes per year. A training centre was built on a 30 rai plot of land in Khlong Sam Wa District in Bangkok, including four training buildings, two accommodation buildings, and a canteen.  It has the capacity to train up to 2,000 workers each year.

References 

Construction and civil engineering companies of Thailand
Companies listed on the Stock Exchange of Thailand